"Ring frei" is a song by German singer LaFee. It was written by Bob Arnz, Gerd Zimmermann and Lafee for her fourth studio album Ring frei. The song is the album's second track and it was released as the album's first single on 21 November 2008 .

Music video
The music video premiered on 31 October 2008 on the German music show VIVA Live.

The video was written and directed by Bastien Francois, and was shot at the Cinegate studio in Berlin, Germany. It depicts Lafee as an action heroine, in which much of the scenes and costumes were based on costumes worn by Catherine Deane, played by Jennifer Lopez in The Cell and several other various action film characters such as Moon in Hero and Yu Shu-lien in Crouching Tiger, Hidden Dragon.

Track listing
These are the formats and track listings of major single releases of "Ring Frei".
CD single: 2 Track Edition
 "Ring frei" (Single version) - 3:31
 "Hand in Hand" - 4:22

CD Single: Fan Edition
 "Ring frei" (Album version) - 3:48
 "Ring frei" (Making of the music video) - 24:33
 "Lafee Interview" - 13:06
 "Ring frei" (Studio performance) - 5:11
 "Ring frei" (Karaoke video) - 3:54

Charts

Personnel 
 Producer: Bob Arnz
 Publisher: Edition twoformusic/ EMI Music Publishing
 Vocals: LaFee
 Writers: Bob Arnz, Gerd Zimmermann, LaFee
 Management: Bob Arnz, Gabriele Geschwinder
 Photography: BITO

References

External links
LaFee official website

2008 singles
LaFee songs
2008 songs
Songs written by Bob Arnz
EMI Records singles
Songs written by Gerd Zimmermann (songwriter)